The A.S. Popov Central Museum of Communications is a museum of science and technology founded in 1872. It is located in the historic centre of Saint Petersburg, Russia, near Saint Isaac's Square.

History 
The museum was opened on 11 September 1872 as the Telegraph Museum. The head of the Telegraph Department of Russia Carl Luders proclaimed the foundation of this museum:

In 1884, the post office branch was added and the museum was transformed into the Postal and Telegraph Museum.

In 1945, the museum was named after the Russian scientist and inventor Alexander Stepanovich Popov.

By the late 1970s, the museum housed more than 4 million stamps, stamped envelopes, and postcards.

Nowadays, the museum is a leading institution in its field in the Russian Federation. As such, it provides consulting supervision for other telecommunications museums.

Collections 
The museum archives and collections include over 8 million items including:
 documents and items related to the history of post, telegraph and telephone, radio and broadcasting, space communication, and modern means of telecommunications,
 15,000 apparatuses and technical pieces,
 50,000 archival documents,
 vast collections of stamps and postal stationery, including 8 million items of the Russian National Collection of Philately,
 50,000 books and periodicals of the specialised research library.

Address 
The museum is situated at the address: 7 Pochtamtskaya Street, Saint Petersburg, 190000, Russia.

See also

References

External links 
 

Museums established in 1872
Science museums in Saint Petersburg
Telecommunications museums
Postal museums
Philatelic museums
Postal history of Russia
1872 establishments in the Russian Empire
Communications
Cultural heritage monuments of federal significance in Saint Petersburg